Harold Paul Cauldwell (July 14, 1896 – October 30, 1952) was an American football tackle who played two seasons with the Akron Pros/Indians of the National Football League. He played college football at Wabash College. His name is sometimes spelled as Caldwell.

References

External links
Just Sports Stats
Fanbase profile

1896 births
1952 deaths
Players of American football from Indiana
American football offensive tackles
Wabash Little Giants football players
Akron Pros players
Akron Indians players
People from Parke County, Indiana